Cotocollao may refer to:

Cotocollao (Parish), a parish of northwestern Quito
Cotocollao Indians, a group of Indians named after the Cotocollao zone